Asia is the largest continent in the world by both land area and population. It covers an area of more than 44 million square kilometers, about 30% of Earth's total land area and 8% of Earth's total surface area. The continent, which has long been home to the majority of the human population, was the site of many of the first civilizations. Its 4.7 billion people constitute roughly 60% of the world's population, having more people than all other continents combined.

Asia shares the landmass of Eurasia with Europe and Afro-Eurasia with both Europe and Africa. In general terms, it is bounded on the east by the Pacific Ocean, on the south by the Indian Ocean, and on the north by the Arctic Ocean. The border of Asia with Europe is a historical and cultural construct, as there is no clear physical and geographical separation between them. It is somewhat arbitrary and has moved since its first conception in classical antiquity. The division of Eurasia into two continents reflects East–West cultural, linguistic, and ethnic differences, some of which vary on a spectrum rather than with a sharp dividing line. A commonly accepted division places Asia to the east of the Suez Canal separating it from Africa; and to the east of the Turkish Straits, the Ural Mountains and Ural River, and to the south of the Caucasus Mountains and the Caspian and Black seas, separating it from Europe.

China and India alternated in being the largest economies in the world from 1 to 1,800 CE. China was a major economic power and attracted many to the east, and for many the legendary wealth and prosperity of the ancient culture of India personified Asia, attracting European commerce, exploration and colonialism. The accidental discovery of a trans-Atlantic route from Europe to America by Columbus while in search for a route to India demonstrates this deep fascination. The Silk Road became the main east–west trading route in the Asian hinterlands while the Straits of Malacca stood as a major sea route. Asia has exhibited economic dynamism (particularly East Asia) as well as robust population growth during the 20th century, but overall population growth has since fallen. Asia was the birthplace of most of the world's mainstream religions including Hinduism, Zoroastrianism, Judaism, Jainism, Buddhism, Confucianism, Taoism, Christianity, Islam, Sikhism, as well as many other religions.

Given its size and diversity, the concept of Asia—a name dating back to classical antiquity—may actually have more to do with human geography than physical geography. Asia varies greatly across and within its regions with regard to ethnic groups, cultures, environments, economics, historical ties and government systems. It also has a mix of many different climates ranging from the equatorial south via the hot desert in the Middle East, temperate areas in the east and the  continental centre to vast subarctic and polar areas in Siberia.

Definition and boundaries

Asia–Africa boundary 
The boundary between Asia and Africa is the Red Sea, the Gulf of Suez, and the Suez Canal. This makes Egypt a transcontinental country, with the Sinai peninsula in Asia and the remainder of the country in Africa.

Asia–Europe boundary 

The threefold division of the Old World into Europe, Asia and Africa has been in use since the 6th century BCE, due to Greek geographers such as Anaximander and Hecataeus. Anaximander placed the boundary between Asia and Europe along the Phasis River (the modern Rioni river) in Georgia of Caucasus (from its mouth by Poti on the Black Sea coast, through the Surami Pass and along the Kura River to the Caspian Sea), a convention still followed by Herodotus in the 5th century BCE. During the Hellenistic period, this convention was revised, and the boundary between Europe and Asia was now considered to be the Tanais (the modern Don River). This is the convention used by Roman era authors such as Posidonius, Strabo and Ptolemy.

The border between Asia and Europe was historically defined by European academics. The Don River became unsatisfactory to northern Europeans when Peter the Great, king of the Tsardom of Russia, defeating rival claims of Sweden and the Ottoman Empire to the eastern lands, and armed resistance by the tribes of Siberia, synthesized a new Russian Empire extending to the Ural Mountains and beyond, founded in 1721.

In Sweden, five years after Peter's death, in 1730 Philip Johan von Strahlenberg published a new atlas proposing the Ural Mountains as the border of Asia. Tatishchev announced that he had proposed the idea to von Strahlenberg. The latter had suggested the Emba River as the lower boundary. Over the next century various proposals were made until the Ural River prevailed in the mid-19th century. The border had been moved perforce from the Black Sea to the Caspian Sea into which the Ural River projects. The border between the Black Sea and the Caspian is usually placed along the crest of the Caucasus Mountains, although it is sometimes placed further north.

Asia–Oceania boundary 
The border between Asia and the region of Oceania is usually placed somewhere in the Malay Archipelago. The Maluku Islands in Indonesia are often considered to lie on the border of southeast Asia, with New Guinea, to the east of the islands, being wholly part of Oceania. The terms Southeast Asia and Oceania, devised in the 19th century, have had several vastly different geographic meanings since their inception. The chief factor in determining which islands of the Malay Archipelago are Asian has been the location of the colonial possessions of the various empires there (not all European). Lewis and Wigen assert, "The narrowing of 'Southeast Asia' to its present boundaries was thus a gradual process."

Asia–North America boundary 
The Bering Strait and Bering Sea separate the landmasses of Asia and North America, as well as forming the international boundary between Russia and the United States. This national and continental boundary separates the Diomede Islands in the Bering Strait, with Big Diomede in Russia and Little Diomede in the United States. The Aleutian Islands are an island chain extending westward from the Alaskan Peninsula toward Russia's Komandorski Islands and Kamchatka Peninsula. Most of them are always associated with North America, except for the westernmost Near Islands group, which is on Asia's continental shelf beyond the North Aleutians Basin and on rare occasions could be associated with Asia, which could then allow the U.S. state of Alaska as well as the United States itself to be considered a transcontinental state. The Aleutian Islands are sometimes associated with Oceania, owing to their status as remote Pacific islands, and their proximity to the Pacific Plate. This is extremely rare however, due to their non-tropical biogeography, as well as their inhabitants, who have historically been related to Indigenous Americans.

St. Lawrence Island in the northern Bering Sea belongs to Alaska and may be associated with either continent but is almost always considered part of North America, as with the Rat Islands in the Aleutian chain. At their nearest points, Alaska and Russia are separated by only .

Ongoing definition 

Geographical Asia is a cultural artifact of European conceptions of the world, beginning with the Ancient Greeks, being imposed onto other cultures, an imprecise concept causing endemic contention about what it means. Asia does not exactly correspond to the cultural borders of its various types of constituents.

From the time of Herodotus a minority of geographers have rejected the three-continent system (Europe, Africa, Asia) on the grounds that there is no substantial physical separation between them. For example, Sir Barry Cunliffe, the emeritus professor of European archeology at Oxford, argues that Europe has been geographically and culturally merely "the western excrescence of the continent of Asia".

Geographically, Asia is the major eastern constituent of the continent of Eurasia with Europe being a northwestern peninsula of the landmass. Asia, Europe and Africa make up a single continuous landmass—Afro-Eurasia (except for the Suez Canal)—and share a common continental shelf. Almost all of Europe and a major part of Asia sit atop the Eurasian Plate, adjoined on the south by the Arabian and Indian Plate and with the easternmost part of Siberia (east of the Chersky Range) on the North American Plate.

Etymology 

The term "Asia" is believed to originate in the Bronze Age placename Assuwa which originally referred only to a portion of northwestern Anatolia. The term appears in Hittite records recounting how a confederation of Assuwan states including Troy unsuccessfully rebelled against the Hittite king Tudhaliya I around 1400 BCE. Roughly contemporary Linear B documents contain the term asiwia, seemingly in reference to captives from the same area.

Herodotus used the term Ἀσία in reference to Anatolia and the territory of the Persian Empire, in contrast to Greece and Egypt. He reports that Greeks assumed that Asia was named after the wife of Prometheus, but that Lydians say it was named after Asies, son of Cotys, who passed the name on to a tribe at Sardis. In Greek mythology, "Asia" (Ἀσία) or "Asie" (Ἀσίη) was the name of a "Nymph or Titan goddess of Lydia". According to many Muslims, the term came from Ancient Egypt's Queen Asiya, the adoptive mother of Moses.

The term was later adopted by the Romans, who used it in reference to the province of Asia, located in western Anatolia. One of the first  writers to use Asia as a name of the whole continent was Pliny.

History 

The history of Asia can be seen as the distinct histories of several peripheral coastal regions: East Asia, South Asia, Southeast Asia and the Middle East, linked by the interior mass of the Central Asian steppes.
The coastal periphery was home to some of the world's earliest known civilizations, each of them developing around fertile river valleys. The civilizations in Mesopotamia, the Indus Valley and the Yellow River shared many similarities. These civilizations may well have exchanged technologies and ideas such as mathematics and the wheel. Other innovations, such as writing, seem to have been developed individually in each area. Cities, states and empires developed in these lowlands.

The central steppe region had long been inhabited by horse-mounted nomads who could reach all areas of Asia from the steppes. The earliest postulated expansion out of the steppe is that of the Indo-Europeans, who spread their languages into the Middle East, South Asia, and the borders of China, where the Tocharians resided. The northernmost part of Asia, including much of Siberia, was largely inaccessible to the steppe nomads, owing to the dense forests, climate and tundra. These areas remained very sparsely populated.

The center and the peripheries were mostly kept separated by mountains and deserts. The Caucasus and Himalaya mountains and the Karakum and Gobi deserts formed barriers that the steppe horsemen could cross only with difficulty. While the urban city dwellers were more advanced technologically and socially, in many cases they could do little in a military aspect to defend against the mounted hordes of the steppe. However, the lowlands did not have enough open grasslands to support a large horsebound force; for this and other reasons, the nomads who conquered states in China, India, and the Middle East often found themselves adapting to the local, more affluent societies.

The Islamic Caliphate's defeats of the Byzantine and Persian empires led to West Asia and southern parts of Central Asia and western parts of South Asia under its control during its conquests of the 7th century. The Mongol Empire conquered a large part of Asia in the 13th century, an area extending from China to Europe. Before the Mongol invasion, Song dynasty reportedly had approximately 120 million citizens; the 1300 census which followed the invasion reported roughly 60 million people.

The Black Death, one of the most devastating pandemics in human history, is thought to have originated in the arid plains of central Asia, where it then travelled along the Silk Road.

The Russian Empire began to expand into Asia from the 17th century, and would eventually take control of all of Siberia and most of Central Asia by the end of the 19th century. The Ottoman Empire controlled Anatolia, most of the Middle East, North Africa and the Balkans from the mid 16th century onwards. In the 17th century, the Manchu conquered China and established the Qing dynasty. The Islamic Mughal Empire and the Hindu Maratha Empire controlled much of India in the 16th and 18th centuries respectively. The Empire of Japan controlled most of East Asia and much of Southeast Asia, New Guinea and the Pacific islands until the end of World War II.

Geography 

Asia is the largest continent on Earth. Asia is generally defined as comprising the eastern four-fifths of Eurasia. It is located to the east of the Suez Canal and the Ural Mountains, and south of the Caucasus Mountains (or the Kuma–Manych Depression) and the Caspian and Black Seas. It is bounded on the east by the Pacific Ocean, on the south by the Indian Ocean and on the north by the Arctic Ocean. Asia is subdivided into 49 countries, five of them (Georgia, Azerbaijan, Russia, Kazakhstan and Turkey) are transcontinental countries lying partly in Europe. Geographically, Russia is partly in Asia, but is considered a European nation, both culturally and politically.

The Gobi Desert is in Mongolia and the Arabian Desert stretches across much of the Middle East. The Yangtze River in China is the longest river in the continent. The Himalayas between Nepal and China is the tallest mountain range in the world. Tropical rainforests stretch across much of southern Asia and coniferous and deciduous forests lie farther north.

Main regions 

There are various approaches to the regional division of Asia. The following subdivision into regions is used, among others, by the UN statistics agency UNSD. This division of Asia into regions by the United Nations is done solely for statistical reasons and does not imply any assumption about political or other affiliations of countries and territories.
 North Asia (Siberia)
 Central Asia (The 'stans)
 Western Asia (The Middle East or Near East and the Caucasus)
 South Asia (Indian subcontinent)
 East Asia (Far East)
 Southeast Asia (East Indies and Indochina)

Climate 

Asia has extremely diverse climate features. Climates range from arctic and subarctic in Siberia to tropical in southern India and Southeast Asia. It is moist across southeast sections, and dry across much of the interior. Some of the largest daily temperature ranges on Earth occur in western sections of Asia. The monsoon circulation dominates across southern and eastern sections, due to the presence of the Himalayas forcing the formation of a thermal low which draws in moisture during the summer. Southwestern sections of the continent are hot. Siberia is one of the coldest places in the Northern Hemisphere, and can act as a source of arctic air masses for North America. The most active place on Earth for tropical cyclone activity lies northeast of the Philippines and south of Japan.

Climate change

Climate change is having major impacts on many countries in the continent.
A survey carried out in 2010 by global risk analysis farm Maplecroft identified 16 countries that are extremely vulnerable to climate change. Each nation's vulnerability was calculated using 42 socio, economic and environmental indicators, which identified the likely climate change impacts during the next 30 years. The Asian countries of Bangladesh, India, the Philippines, Vietnam, Thailand, Pakistan, China and Sri Lanka were among the 16 countries facing extreme risk from climate change. Some shifts are already occurring. For example, in tropical parts of India with a semi-arid climate, the temperature increased by 0.4 °C between 1901 and 2003.
A 2013 study by the International Crops Research Institute for the Semi-Arid Tropics (ICRISAT) aimed to find science-based, pro-poor approaches and techniques that would enable Asia's agricultural systems to cope with climate change, while benefitting poor and vulnerable farmers. The study's recommendations ranged from improving the use of climate information in local planning and strengthening weather-based agro-advisory services, to stimulating diversification of rural household incomes and providing incentives to farmers to adopt natural resource conservation measures to enhance forest cover, replenish groundwater and use renewable energy.

The ten countries of the Association of Southeast Asian Nations (ASEAN) – Brunei, Cambodia, Indonesia, Laos, Malaysia, Myanmar, the Philippines, Singapore, Thailand, and Vietnam – are among the most vulnerable to the effects of climate change in the world, however, ASEAN's climate mitigation efforts are not commensurate with the climate threats and risks it faces.

Economy 

Asia has the largest continental economy by both GDP Nominal and PPP in the world, and is the fastest growing economic region. , the largest economies in Asia are China, Japan, India, South Korea, Indonesia and Turkey based on GDP in both nominal and PPP. Based on Global Office Locations 2011, Asia dominated the office locations with 4 of the top 5 being in Asia: Hong Kong, Singapore, Tokyo and Seoul. Around 68 percent of international firms have an office in Hong Kong.

In the late 1990s and early 2000s, the economies of China and India grew rapidly, both with an average annual growth rate of more than 8%. Other recent very-high-growth nations in Asia include Israel, Malaysia, Indonesia, Bangladesh, Thailand, Vietnam, and the Philippines, and mineral-rich nations such as Kazakhstan, Turkmenistan, Iran, Brunei, the United Arab Emirates, Qatar, Kuwait, Saudi Arabia, Bahrain and Oman.

According to economic historian Angus Maddison in his book The World Economy: A Millennial Perspective, India had the world's largest economy during 0 BCE and 1000 BCE. Historically, India was the largest economy in the world for most of the two millennia from the 1st until 19th century, contributing 25% of the world's industrial output. China was the largest and most advanced economy on earth for much of recorded history and shared the mantle with India. For several decades in the late twentieth century Japan was the largest economy in Asia and second-largest of any single nation in the world, after surpassing the Soviet Union (measured in net material product) in 1990 and Germany in 1968. (NB: A number of supernational economies are larger, such as the European Union (EU), the North American Free Trade Agreement (NAFTA) or APEC). This ended in 2010 when China overtook Japan to become the world's second largest economy.

In the late 1980s and early 1990s, Japan's GDP was almost as large (current exchange rate method) as that of the rest of Asia combined. In 1995, Japan's economy nearly equaled that of the US as the largest economy in the world for a day, after the Japanese currency reached a record high of 79 yen/US$. Economic growth in Asia since World War II to the 1990s had been concentrated in Japan as well as the four regions of South Korea, Taiwan, Hong Kong and Singapore located in the Pacific Rim, known as the Asian tigers, which have now all received developed country status, having the highest GDP per capita in Asia.

It is forecasted that India will overtake Japan in terms of nominal GDP by 2025. By 2027, according to Goldman Sachs, China will have the largest economy in the world. Several trade blocs exist, with the most developed being the Association of Southeast Asian Nations.

Asia is the largest continent in the world by a considerable margin, and it is rich in natural resources, such as petroleum, forests, fish, water, rice, copper and silver. Manufacturing in Asia has traditionally been strongest in East and Southeast Asia, particularly in China, Taiwan, South Korea, Japan, India, the Philippines, and Singapore. Japan and South Korea continue to dominate in the area of multinational corporations, but increasingly the PRC and India are making significant inroads. Many companies from Europe, North America, South Korea and Japan have operations in Asia's developing countries to take advantage of its abundant supply of cheap labour and relatively developed infrastructure.

According to Citigroup 9 of 11 Global Growth Generators countries came from Asia driven by population and income growth. They are Bangladesh, China, India, Indonesia, Iraq, Mongolia, the Philippines, Sri Lanka and Vietnam. Asia has three main financial centers: Hong Kong, Tokyo and Singapore. Call centers and business process outsourcing (BPOs) are becoming major employers in India and the Philippines due to the availability of a large pool of highly skilled, English-speaking workers. The increased use of outsourcing has assisted the rise of India and the China as financial centers. Due to its large and extremely competitive information technology industry, India has become a major hub for outsourcing.

Trade between Asian countries and countries on other continents is largely carried out on the sea routes that are important for Asia. Individual main routes have emerged from this. The main route leads from the Chinese coast south via Hanoi to Jakarta, Singapore and Kuala Lumpur through the Strait of Malacca via the Sri Lankan Colombo to the southern tip of India via Malé to East Africa Mombasa, from there to Djibouti, then through the Red Sea over the Suez Canal into Mediterranean, there via Haifa, Istanbul and Athens to the upper Adriatic to the northern Italian hub of Trieste with its rail connections to Central and Eastern Europe or further to Barcelona and around Spain and France to the European northern ports. A far smaller part of the goods traffic runs via South Africa to Europe. A particularly significant part of the Asian goods traffic is carried out across the Pacific towards Los Angeles and Long Beach. In contrast to the sea routes, the Silk Road via the land route to Europe is on the one hand still under construction and on the other hand is much smaller in terms of scope. Intra-Asian trade, including sea trade, is growing rapidly.

In 2010, Asia had 3.3 million millionaires (people with net worth over US$1 million excluding their homes), slightly below North America with 3.4 million millionaires. Last year Asia had toppled Europe.
Citigroup in The Wealth Report 2012 stated that Asian centa-millionaire overtook North America's wealth for the first time as the world's "economic center of gravity" continued moving east. At the end of 2011, there were 18,000 Asian people mainly in Southeast Asia, China and Japan who have at least $100 million in disposable assets, while North America with 17,000 people and Western Europe with 14,000 people.

Tourism 

With growing Regional Tourism with domination of Chinese visitors, MasterCard has released Global Destination Cities Index 2013 with 10 of 20 are dominated by Asia and Pacific Region Cities and also for the first time a city of a country from Asia (Bangkok) set in the top-ranked with 15.98 million international visitors.

Demographics 

East Asia had by far the strongest overall Human Development Index (HDI) improvement of any region in the world, nearly doubling average HDI attainment over the past 40 years, according to the report's analysis of health, education and income data. China, the second highest achiever in the world in terms of HDI improvement since
1970, is the only country on the "Top 10 Movers" list due to income rather than health or education achievements. Its per capita income increased a stunning 21-fold over the last four decades, also lifting hundreds of millions out of income poverty. Yet it was not among the region's top performers in improving school enrollment and life expectancy.
Nepal, a South Asian country, emerges as one of the world's fastest movers since 1970 mainly due to health and education achievements. Its present life expectancy is 25 years longer than in the 1970s. More than four of every five children of school age in Nepal now attend primary school, compared to just one in five 40 years ago.
 Hong Kong ranked highest among the countries grouped on the HDI (number 7 in the world, which is in the "very high human development" category), followed by Singapore (9), Japan (19) and South Korea (22). Afghanistan (155) ranked lowest amongst Asian countries out of the 169 countries assessed.

Languages 

Asia is home to several language families and many language isolates. Most Asian countries have more than one language that is natively spoken. For instance, according to Ethnologue, more than 600 languages are spoken in Indonesia, more than 800 languages spoken in India, and more than 100 are spoken in the Philippines. China has many languages and dialects in different provinces.

Religions 

Many of the world's major religions have their origins in Asia, including the five most practiced in the world (excluding irreligion), which are Christianity, Islam, Hinduism, Chinese folk religion (classified as Confucianism and Taoism), and Buddhism respectively. Asian mythology is complex and diverse. The story of the Great Flood for example, as presented to Jews in the Hebrew Bible in the narrative of Noah—and later to Christians in the Old Testament, and to Muslims in the Quran—is earliest found in Mesopotamian mythology, in the Enûma Eliš and Epic of Gilgamesh. Hindu mythology similarly tells about an avatar of Vishnu in the form of a fish who warned Manu of a terrible flood. Ancient Chinese mythology also tells of a Great Flood spanning generations, one that required the combined efforts of emperors and divinities to control.

Abrahamic 

The Abrahamic religions including Judaism, Christianity, Islam, Druze faith, and Baháʼí Faith originated in West Asia.

Judaism, the oldest of the Abrahamic faiths, is practiced primarily in Israel, the indigenous homeland and historical birthplace of the Hebrew nation: which today consists both of those Jews who remained in the Middle East and those who returned from diaspora in Europe, North America, and other regions; though various diaspora communities persist worldwide. Jews are the predominant ethnic group in Israel (75.6%) numbering at about 6.1 million, although the levels of adherence to Jewish religion vary. Outside of Israel there are small ancient Jewish communities in Turkey (17,400), Azerbaijan (9,100), Iran (8,756), India (5,000) and Uzbekistan (4,000), among many other places. In total, there are 14.4–17.5 million (2016, est.) Jews alive in the world today, making them one of the smallest Asian minorities, at roughly 0.3 to 0.4 percent of the total population of the continent.

Christianity is a widespread religion in Asia with more than 286 million adherents according to Pew Research Center in 2010, and nearly 364 million according to Britannica Book of the Year 2014. Constituting around 12.6% of the total population of Asia. In the Philippines and East Timor, Roman Catholicism is the predominant religion; it was introduced by the Spaniards and the Portuguese, respectively. In Armenia and Georgia, Eastern Orthodoxy is the predominant religion. In the Middle East, such as in the Levant, Anatolia and Fars, Syriac Christianity (Church of the East) and Oriental Orthodoxy are prevalent minority denominations, which are both Eastern Christian sects mainly adhered to Assyrian people or Syriac Christians. Vibrant indigenous minorities in Western Asia are adhering to the Eastern Catholic Churches and Eastern Orthodoxy. Saint Thomas Christians in India trace their origins to the evangelistic activity of Thomas the Apostle in the 1st century. Significant Christian communities also found in Central Asia, South Asia, Southeast Asia and East Asia.

Islam, which originated in the Hejaz located in modern-day Saudi Arabia, is the second largest and most widely-spread religion in Asia with at least 1 billion Muslims constituting around 23.8% of the total population of Asia. With 12.7% of the world Muslim population, the country currently with the largest Muslim population in the world is Indonesia, followed by Pakistan (11.5%), India (10%), Bangladesh, Iran and Turkey. Mecca, Medina and Jerusalem are the three holiest cities for Islam in all the world. The Hajj and Umrah attract large numbers of Muslim devotees from all over the world to Mecca and Medina. Iran is the largest Shi'a country.

The Druze Faith or Druzism originated in Western Asia, is a monotheistic religion based on the teachings of figures like Hamza ibn-'Ali ibn-Ahmad and Al-Hakim bi-Amr Allah, and Greek philosophers such as Plato and Aristotle. The number of Druze people worldwide is around one million, with about 45% to 50% live in Syria, 35% to 40% live in Lebanon, and less than 10% live in Israel, with recently there has been a growing Druze diaspora.

The Baháʼí Faith originated in Asia, in Iran (Persia), and spread from there to the Ottoman Empire, Central Asia, India, and Burma during the lifetime of Bahá'u'lláh. Since the middle of the 20th century, growth has particularly occurred in other Asian countries, because Baháʼí activities in many Muslim countries has been severely suppressed by authorities. Lotus Temple is a big Baháʼí Temple in India.

Indian and East Asian religions 

Almost all Asian religions have philosophical character and Asian philosophical traditions cover a large spectrum of philosophical thoughts and writings. Indian philosophy includes Hindu philosophy and Buddhist philosophy. They include elements of nonmaterial pursuits, whereas another school of thought from India, Cārvāka, preached the enjoyment of the material world. The religions of Hinduism, Buddhism, Jainism and Sikhism originated in India, South Asia. In East Asia, particularly in China and Japan, Confucianism, Taoism and Zen Buddhism took shape.

, Hinduism has around 1.1 billion adherents. The faith represents around 25% of Asia's population and is the largest religion in Asia. However, it is mostly concentrated in South Asia. Over 80% of the populations of both India and Nepal adhere to Hinduism, alongside significant communities in Bangladesh, Pakistan, Bhutan, Sri Lanka and Bali, Indonesia. Many overseas Indians in countries such as Burma, Singapore and Malaysia also adhere to Hinduism.

Buddhism has a great following in mainland Southeast Asia and East Asia. Buddhism is the religion of the majority of the populations of Cambodia (96%), Thailand (95%), Burma (80–89%), Japan (36–96%), Bhutan (75–84%), Sri Lanka (70%), Laos (60–67%) and Mongolia (53–93%). Taiwan (35–93%), South Korea (23–50%), Malaysia (19–21%), Nepal (9–11%), Vietnam (10–75%), China (20–50%), North Korea (2–14%), and small communities in India and Bangladesh. The Communist-governed countries of China, Vietnam and North Korea are officially atheist, thus the number of Buddhists and other religious adherents may be under-reported.

Jainism is found mainly in India and in overseas Indian communities such as the United States and Malaysia. Sikhism is found in Northern India and amongst overseas Indian communities in other parts of Asia, especially Southeast Asia. Confucianism is found predominantly in Mainland China, South Korea, Taiwan and in overseas Chinese populations. Taoism is found mainly in Mainland China, Taiwan, Malaysia and Singapore. In many Chinese communities, Taoism is easily syncretized with Mahayana Buddhism, thus exact religious statistics are difficult to obtain and may be understated or overstated.

Modern conflicts 

Some of the events pivotal in the Asia territory related to the relationship with the outside world in the post-Second World War were:
 The Partition of India
 The Chinese Civil War
 The Kashmir conflict
 The Balochistan Conflict
 The Naxalite–Maoist insurgency in India
 The Korean War
 The French Indochina War
 The Vietnam War
 The Indonesia–Malaysia confrontation
 The 1959 Tibetan uprising
 The Sino-Vietnamese War
 The Bangladesh Liberation War
 The Yom Kippur War
 The Xinjiang conflict
 The Iranian Revolution
 The Soviet–Afghan War
 The Iran–Iraq War
 The Cambodian Killing Fields
 The Insurgency in Laos
 The Lebanese Civil War
 The Sri Lankan Civil War
 The 1988 Maldives coup d'état
 The Dissolution of the Soviet Union
 The Gulf War
 The Nepalese Civil War
 The Indo-Pakistani wars and conflicts
 The West Papua conflict
 The First Nagorno-Karabakh War
 The 1989 Tiananmen Square protests
 The Indonesian occupation of East Timor
 The 1999 Pakistani coup d'état
 The War in Afghanistan
 The Iraq War
 The South Thailand insurgency
 The 2006 Thai coup d'état
 The Burmese Civil War
 The Saffron Revolution
 The Kurdish–Turkish conflict
 The Arab Spring
 The Israeli–Palestinian conflict
 The Arab–Israeli conflict
 The Syrian Civil War
 The Sino-Indian War
 The 2014 Thai coup d'état
 The Moro conflict in the Philippines
 The Islamic State of Iraq and the Levant
 The Turkish invasion of Syria
 The Rohingya crisis in Myanmar
 The Saudi Arabian-led intervention in Yemen
 The Hong Kong protests
 The 2020 China–India skirmishes

Culture 

The culture of Asia is a diverse blend of customs and traditions that have been practiced by the various ethnic groups of the continent for centuries. The continent is divided into six geographic sub-regions: Central Asia, East Asia, North Asia, South Asia, Southeast Asia, and West Asia. These regions are defined by their cultural similarities, including common religions, languages, and ethnicities. West Asia, also known as Southwest Asia or the Middle East, has cultural roots in the ancient civilizations of the Fertile Crescent and Mesopotamia, which gave rise to the Persian, Arab, Ottoman empires, as well as the Abrahamic religions of Judaism and Islam. These civilizations, which are located in the Hilly flanks, are among the oldest in the world, with evidence of farming dating back to around 9000 BCE. Despite the challenges posed by the vast size of the continent and the presence of natural barriers such as deserts and mountain ranges, trade and commerce have helped to create a Pan-Asian culture that is shared across the region.

Nobel prizes 

The polymath Rabindranath Tagore, a Bengali poet, dramatist, and writer from Santiniketan, now in West Bengal, India, became in 1913 the first Asian Nobel laureate. He won his Nobel Prize in Literature for notable impact his prose works and poetic thought had on English, French, and other national literatures of Europe and the Americas. He is also the writer of the national anthems of Bangladesh and India.

Other Asian writers who won Nobel Prize for literature include Yasunari Kawabata (Japan, 1968), Kenzaburō Ōe (Japan, 1994), Gao Xingjian (China, 2000), Orhan Pamuk (Turkey, 2006), and Mo Yan (China, 2012). Some may consider the American writer, Pearl S. Buck, an honorary Asian Nobel laureate, having spent considerable time in China as the daughter of missionaries, and based many of her novels, namely The Good Earth (1931) and The Mother (1933), as well as the biographies of her parents for their time in China, The Exile and Fighting Angel, all of which earned her the Literature prize in 1938.

Also, Mother Teresa of India and Shirin Ebadi of Iran were awarded the Nobel Peace Prize for their significant and pioneering efforts for democracy and human rights, especially for the rights of women and children. Ebadi is the first Iranian and the first Muslim woman to receive the prize. Another Nobel Peace Prize winner is Aung San Suu Kyi from Burma for her peaceful and non-violent struggle under a military dictatorship in Burma. She is a nonviolent pro-democracy activist and leader of the National League for Democracy in Burma (Myanmar) and a noted prisoner of conscience. She is a Buddhist and was awarded the Nobel Peace Prize in 1991. Chinese dissident Liu Xiaobo was awarded the Nobel Peace Prize for "his long and non-violent struggle for fundamental human rights in China" on 8 October 2010. He is the first Chinese citizen to be awarded a Nobel Prize of any kind while residing in China. In 2014, Kailash Satyarthi from India and Malala Yousafzai from Pakistan were awarded the Nobel Peace Prize "for their struggle against the suppression of children and young people and for the right of all children to education".

Sir C.V. Raman is the first Asian to get a Nobel prize in Sciences. He won the Nobel Prize in Physics "for his work on the scattering of light and for the discovery of the effect named after him".

Japan has won the most Nobel Prizes of any Asian nation with 24 followed by India which has won 13.

Amartya Sen, (born 3 November 1933) is an Indian economist who was awarded the 1998 Nobel Memorial Prize in Economic Sciences for his contributions to welfare economics and social choice theory, and for his interest in the problems of society's poorest members.

Other Asian Nobel Prize winners include Subrahmanyan Chandrasekhar, Abdus Salam, Malala Yousafzai, Robert Aumann, Menachem Begin, Aaron Ciechanover, Avram Hershko, Daniel Kahneman, Shimon Peres, Yitzhak Rabin, Ada Yonath, Yasser Arafat, José Ramos-Horta and Bishop Carlos Filipe Ximenes Belo of Timor Leste, Kim Dae-jung, and 13 Japanese scientists. Most of the said awardees are from Japan and Israel except for Chandrasekhar and Raman (India), Abdus Salam and Malala Yousafzai, (Pakistan), Arafat (Palestinian Territories), Kim (South Korea), and Horta and Belo (Timor Leste).

In 2006, Dr. Muhammad Yunus of Bangladesh was awarded the Nobel Peace Prize for the establishment of Grameen Bank, a community development bank that lends money to poor people, especially women in Bangladesh. Dr. Yunus received his PhD in economics from Vanderbilt University, United States. He is internationally known for the concept of micro credit which allows poor and destitute people with little or no collateral to borrow money. The borrowers typically pay back money within the specified period and the incidence of default is very low.

The Dalai Lama has received approximately eighty-four awards over his spiritual and political career. On 22 June 2006, he became one of only four people ever to be recognized with Honorary Citizenship by the Governor General of Canada. On 28 May 2005, he received the Christmas Humphreys Award from the Buddhist Society in the United Kingdom. Most notable was the Nobel Peace Prize, presented in Oslo, Norway on 10 December 1989.

Political geography 

Within the above-mentioned states are several partially recognized countries with limited to no international recognition. None of them are members of the UN:

See also 

References to articles:

 Subregions of Asia
Special topics:
 Asian Century
 Asian cuisine
 Asian furniture
 Asian Games
 Asia-Pacific
 Asian Para Games
 Asian Monetary Unit
 Asian people
 Eastern world
 Eurasia
 Far East
 East Asia
 Southeast Asia
 South Asia
 Central Asia
 Western Asia
 North Asia
 Fauna of Asia
 Flags of Asia
 Middle East
 Eastern Mediterranean
 Levant
 Near East
 Pan-Asianism

Lists:
 List of cities in Asia
 List of metropolitan areas in Asia by population
 List of sovereign states and dependent territories in Asia

Projects
 Asian Highway Network
 Trans-Asian Railway

Notes

References

Bibliography

Further reading 
 Embree, Ainslie T., ed. Encyclopedia of Asian history (1988)
vol. 1 online; vol 2 online; vol 3 online; vol 4 online
 Higham, Charles. Encyclopedia of Ancient Asian Civilizations. Facts on File library of world history. New York: Facts On File, 2004.
 Kamal, Niraj. "Arise Asia: Respond to White Peril". New Delhi: Wordsmith, 2002, 
 Kapadia, Feroz, and Mandira Mukherjee. Encyclopaedia of Asian Culture and Society. New Delhi: Anmol Publications, 1999.
 Levinson, David, and Karen Christensen, eds. Encyclopedia of Modern Asia. (6 vol. Charles Scribner's Sons, 2002).

External links 
   
    
 Asia: Human Geography at the National Geographic Society
    
 Asian Reading Room from the United States Library of Congress 
 
 
 
 
 

 
Continents